Divaricella quadrisulcata, or the cross-hatched lucine, is a species of marine bivalve mollusc in the family Lucinidae.

Distribution
Found along the Atlantic coast of North America, 
ranging from Massachusetts to the West Indies.

Habitat
Large sandy areas, in shallow water, 
often providing a food source for Naticidae moon snails.

References

Lucinidae
Bivalves described in 1842